Márcia Mendes (July 6, 1945, in Mato Grosso do Sul – July 6, 1979, in Rio de Janeiro) was a Brazilian actress and journalist. She was a journalist of TV newscast Jornal Hoje for Rede Globo.

References 

1945 births
1979 deaths
Brazilian journalists
People from Três Lagoas
20th-century journalists